Ecbolemia was a genus of moths of the family Noctuidae. It is now considered a synonym of Scythocentropus. It contained four species, which are all transferred to other genera or placed in synonymity.

Former species
Ecbolemia daghestana Boursin, 1944 is a synonym of Scythocentropus misella (Püngeler, 1908)
Ecbolemia misella  Püngeler, 1907 is now Scythocentropus misella (Püngeler, 1908)
Ecbolemia parca  Sukhareva, 1976 is a synonym of Polymixis colluta (Draudt, 1934) 
Ecbolemia singalesia Hampson, 1918 is now Scythocentropus singalesia (Hampson, 1918)

References
Natural History Museum Lepidoptera genus database

Hadeninae